The Stolen Throne is a 1995 fantasy novel  by American writer Harry Turtledove and set in the Videssos universe.

It is the first book in the Time of Troubles tetralogy. The events depicted are strongly based on the historical interaction of Sassanid Persia and Byzantium in the 6th and 7th century. The first book depicts the rise of Sharbaraz (the analog to Khosrau II) to overcome the usurper Smerdis (Bahram Chobin) to become the King of Kings of Makuran (Persia)  with the help of the Videssian Emperor Likinios (Maurice).

References

1995 American novels
American fantasy novels
Novels by Harry Turtledove
Videssos